Petrus Serrarius (Peter Serrarius, Pieter Serrurier, Pierre Serrurier, Pieter Serrarius, Petro Serario, Petrus Serarius; 1600, London – buried October 1, 1669, Amsterdam) was a millenarian theologian, writer, and also a wealthy merchant, who established himself in Amsterdam in 1630, and was active there until his death. He was born "into a well-to-do Walloon merchant family by name of Serrurier in London." He has been called "the dean of the dissident Millenarian theologians in Amsterdam".

He studied at Christ Church, Oxford from 1617 to 1619, and at the Walloon College in Leiden from 1620 to 1623. The French speaking college was then a part of the new Leiden University, where Serrarius met John Dury, and they remained closely associated, right up to Serrarius' own death in 1669.

Circle
In Amsterdam he associated, on the one hand, with the Collegiants Adam Boreel, and Galenus Abrahamsz, and their sect; and, on the other hand, also with the Portuguese Jews settling there at the time, among them Menasseh ben Israel and Benedictus de Spinoza. He was a correspondent of Samuel Hartlib. His involvement with Jews and Judaism led him to the study of Kabbalah and Gematria, and later to a belief in Sabbatai Zevi's messianic claims.

Views and contacts
He published works on the millennium. He was one of the first followers of the Silesian mystic and millenarian Jacob Boehme in Amsterdam.

As well as being a philo-semite, interested greatly in the issue of the Lost Tribes, he was on good terms with the Amsterdam Quakers, and had been in contact with William Ames. He corresponded also with the London Baptist Minister Henry Jessey.

Friendship with Benedictus de Spinoza
Nadler often mentions Serrarius in his biography of Benedictus de Spinoza. Serrarius was very important to Spinoza because Serrarius brought him into contact with the Amsterdam chiliasts and Quakers as well as with Henry Oldenburg. Serrarius may have known Spinoza from the group of Amsterdam Collegiants and may have introduced him to the Quaker William Ames. Oldenburg may have heard from Serrarius about Spinoza and he visited Spinoza in Rijnsburg in mid-July 1662, which led to a strong friendship. Serrarius had attended chemical experiments of Johannes Glauber in Amsterdam with Franciscus van den Enden, the teacher of Spinoza. Maybe Spinoza was there too.

Oldenburg asked Spinoza to send him a copy of his book Renati Descartes principia philosophiae, more geometrico demonstrata via Serrarius. Serrarius acted as postmaster in Amsterdam and courier to England for Spinoza. Later Oldenburg wrote that he had heard from Serrarius that Spinoza was doing well and that he had not forgotten. While Spinoza was in Amsterdam for a few weeks, he spoke to Serrarius. Oldenburg expected a package via Serrarius in Amsterdam, and hoped that Spinoza would send a manuscript with his thoughts on the Bible. Serrarius spread among Protestants in Amsterdam the message that Sabbatai Zevi was the Messiah.

Controversy
Initially an orthodox Calvinist, he had left his church before coming to Amsterdam around 1630. He attacked the views of Moses Amyraut, who had in Du règne de mille ans ou de la Prospérité de l'Église (1654) taken up a position against the millenarians of the time. Serrarius replied with Assertion du règne de mille ans (1657). He in turn was attacked by Samuel Maresius (Samuel Des Marets), a pupil of Franciscus Gomarus. Maresius attempted to undermine the appeal to the work of Joseph Mede made by Serrarius.

Serrarius was also one of the loudest critics of Lodewijk Meyer after the anonymous publication of the latter's Philosophia S. Scripturae Interpres, Exercitatio paradoxa (Philosophy interpreting Sacred Scripture, an exercise in paradox) in 1666, which caused a big controversy in Dutch and wider European Reformed circles at the time.

Publications
Including
 1653: (in Dutch) Goddelycke aandachten ofte vlammende begeerten, Amsterdam Salomon Savrij, 1653. Reprinted in 1657 by Christoffel Luyken
 1657, as Pierre Serrurier: (in French) Assertion Du Règne De Mille Ans, ou de la Prosperité De L'Eglise De Christ en la Terre : Pour servir de Response au Traitté de Monsieur Moyse Amyraut sur ce même suject. Descouverant Le triste Prejugé qui possede aujourd'huy la pluspart des Eglises contre le Regne du Seigneur de toute la Terre, Amsterdam Luycken, 1657.
 1661: (in Dutch) Van den waere wegh tot God, Alkmaar: Jacob Pietersz. Moerbeeck, 1661
 1658 with John Dury and Henry Jessey: (in English) An information concerning the present state of the Jewish nation in Europe and Judea : wherein the footsteps of Providence preparing a way for their conversion to Christ, and for their deliverance from captivity are discovered, London, printed by R.W. for Thomas Brewster, 1658.
 1662: 
 (in English) An awakening warning to the vvofull vvorld : by a voyce in three nations, uttered in a brief dissertation concerning that fatal and to be admired conjunction of all the planets..., Amsterdam, 1662. English version of Van den waere wegh tot God, Amsterdam, unknown publisher
 (in Dutch) Naerder bericht, wegens die groote conjunctie ofte t'samenkomste van allen planeten, in het teecken des hemels, ghenaemt de Schutter, te geschieden den 1/11 December anno 1662. Waer-inne uyt de natuer der sake ... bewesen wort, dat de tweede komste J. Christi ... voor handen zy., Amsterdam, Broer and Ian Appelaer, 1662
 1663: (in Latin) Vox Clamantis in Babylone praeparate viam Domino, i.e. Brevis dissertatio de fatali et admiranda illa planetarum in uno eodemque signo, igneae triplicitatis ultimo, conjunctione. Que ... clare evincitur, illustrem illum Jesu Christi adventum imminere, Amsterdam, Cunrad, 1663 
 1665: 
 (in English) The last letters, to the London-merchants and faithful ministers concerning the further proceedings of the conversion and restauration of the Jews : with most strange and wonderful miracles performed by the holy captain general of the wandring Israelites..., 	[London] G. Cotton, 1665.
 with Samuel Des Marets (Samuel Maresius): (in Latin) De Judæorum I. Universali Conversione, II. In Patriam Reductione, & III. Cultus Levitivi Restitutione; Ut Et IV. De Antichristi ante finalem Mundi interitum Abolitione, Disputatio Adversus Libellum ... , Amsterdam Cunrad 1665

References
van den Berg, Johan, "Quaker and Chiliast: The Contrary Thoughts of William Ames and Petrus Serrarius," in R. Buick Knox (ed.), Reformation, Conformity and Dissent: Essays in Honour of Geoffrey Nuttall, London, Epworth Press, 1977, pp. 180-198.
van der Wall, Ernestine G. E., De mystieke chiliast Petrus Serrarius (1600-1669) en zijn wereld, (Leiden 1987).
van der Wall, Ernestine G. E., "The Amsterdam Millenarian Petrus Serrarius (1600-1669) and the Anglo-Dutch Circle of Philo-Judaists", in J.van den Berg and E.G.E. van den der Wall, eds., Jewish-Christian Relations in the Seventeenth Century (Leiden: Kluwer, 1988) pp. 73–94. openaccess.leidenuniv.nl with Online PDF
 van der Wall, Ernestine G. E., “Petrus Serrarius and Menasseh ben Israel: Christian Millenarianism and Jewish Messianism in Seventeenth-Century Amsterdam,” in Yosef Kaplan, et al., eds., Menasseh Ben Israel and His World, Leiden, Brill, 1989, pp. 164-190.

Notes

External links
 (in French) Ernestine G. E. van der Wall: 10 Petrus Serrarius (1600-1669) et le millénarisme mystique, openaccess.leidenuniv.nl PDF, 14 pp. trad. Carine van Heesewijk. Chapter 10 from Jean-Robert Armogathe (éd.), Le Grand Siècle et la Bible (Bible de Tous les Temps 6), 155 - 168 (1989).
 Ernestine G. E. van der Wall: A Precursor of Christ or a Jewish Impostor? Petrus Serrarius and Jean de Labadie on the Jewish Messianic Movement around Sabbatai Sevi, pp. 109-124 from book ?, openaccess.leidenuniv.nl PDF, 16 pp. Consulted on 21 September 2020.

 Search for graves (www.gravenopinternet.nl) of the Serrurier family in the Walloon Church Amsterdam, lot 216, oldest burial now of 1775.

1600 births
1669 deaths
Arminian theologians
Dutch Calvinist and Reformed theologians
17th-century Calvinist and Reformed theologians
Alumni of Christ Church, Oxford
Leiden University alumni
Writers from Amsterdam